Roy Hall may refer to:

 Roy Hall (American football) (born 1983), American football player
 Roy Hall (racing driver) (1920–1991), American racing driver
 Roy Hall (musician) (1922–1984), American musician